This is a list of Cardiff City Football Club's captains, from 1910, when the club appointed their first captain.

External links

Captains
Cardiff